Fitzroy Elderfield Pestaina  was the Dean of Antigua from 1972  until 1976.

Pestaina was educated at Codrington College and  ordained in 1945. He was successively: Curate at  Christ Church, Barbados then Saint Michael, Barbados; Vicar of All Saints, Barbados; Rector of St Lucy, Barbados and then of Saint Peter, Barbados before his time as Dean.

He died on 16 December, 1976.

References

Alumni of Codrington College
Deans of Antigua
Christ Church, Barbados
Saint Michael, Barbados
Saint Peter, Barbados